Shams ad-Din ibn Muhammad (reigned 1472–1487) was a Sultan of the Sultanate of Adal and a son of Muhammad ibn Badlay.

Reign
During Shams ad-Din's reign, an army of the Emperor of Ethiopia Eskender invaded Adal (around 1479–1480) and looted Dakkar, destroying houses and places of worship. However, on its return home the Adal forces ambushed the Ethiopian army and inflicted heavy casualties. As a result, no further expeditions were sent against Adal by the Ethiopians until the reign of Emperor Na'od.

See also
Walashma dynasty

Notes

Sultans of the Adal Sultanate
15th-century monarchs in Africa
15th-century Somalian people